Evgeniya Andreyevna Ivanova (born 26 July 1987) is a Russian water polo player. At the 2012 Summer Olympics, she competed for the Russian team in the women's event.

Career 
She originally began to play water polo in 2000 in Nizhny Novgorod, following the example of her father and grandfather. She made her international debut at the 2006 European Championship, which Russia won. At her first World Championships, the 2009 Worlds, she scored the winning goal in Russia's bronze medal match. In 2010, she scored Russia's winning goal at the 2010 European Championships.
She participated at the 2011 World Aquatics Championships, and 2017 World Aquatics Championships.

She was part of the Russian team which won bronze at the 2016 Summer Olympics.

See also 
 List of Olympic medalists in water polo (women)
 List of World Aquatics Championships medalists in water polo

References

External links
 

Russian female water polo players
1987 births
Living people
Olympic water polo players of Russia
Water polo players at the 2012 Summer Olympics
World Aquatics Championships medalists in water polo
Water polo players at the 2016 Summer Olympics
Olympic bronze medalists for Russia
Olympic medalists in water polo
Medalists at the 2016 Summer Olympics
Sportspeople from Nizhny Novgorod
Universiade medalists in water polo
Universiade gold medalists for Russia
Medalists at the 2013 Summer Universiade
Water polo players at the 2020 Summer Olympics
Sportspeople from Nizhny Novgorod Oblast
21st-century Russian women